Count Günther VII of Schwarzburg (died 1274) was Count of Schwarzburg-Blankenburg from 1236 until his death.

Life 
Günther was a son of Count Henry II of Schwarzburg-Blankenburg from his marriage with Countess Irmgard of Weimar-Orlamünde (died: c. 1222).

Around 1228/29 Günther is in Jerusalem, together with Emperor Frederick II.

In 1236, he succeeded his father as Count of Schwarzburg-Blankenburg.

During the War of the Thuringian Succession, he was taken prisoner in 1248/1249.

In 1259, he succeeded his brother Henry III as Count of Schwarzburg.

In 1267, he founded the monastery at Saalfeld.

Marriage and issue 
Günther was married with a lady named Sophie, about whom nothing further is known.  They had the following children:
 Günther (died 1289), Count of Schwarzburg-Blankenburg
 Sophie (died 1279), married 1268 with Count Berthold V of Henneberg
 Irmgard (died 1313), abbess of Ilm
 Henry V (died 1285), Count of Schwarzburg-Blankenburg
 Günther X (died c. 1308
 Albert III (died c. 1265
 Günther XI (died c. 1308
 A daughter, who married Count Otto of Lobdeburg-Arnshaugk
 Christina, married c. 1282 to Burgrave Otto of Dohna

External links 
Medieval Genealogy

Counts of Germany
House of Schwarzburg
13th-century births
1274 deaths
Year of birth uncertain
13th-century German nobility
Christians of the Fifth Crusade